Nauzet Santana García (born 8 April 1994) is a Spanish footballer who currently plays for Lincoln Red Imps as a goalkeeper.

Career statistics

Chennai City

Club

Nauzet Santana García has played for teams like Real Ávila, Granada II, Fuenlabrada , Pobla Mafumet, Tenerife.

Notes

Honours

Club
Chennai City FC
I-League: 2018–19

References

1994 births
Living people
Footballers from Santa Cruz de Tenerife
Spanish footballers
Association football goalkeepers
Segunda División B players
CD Tenerife players
CF Fuenlabrada footballers
Club Recreativo Granada players
Deportivo Rayo Cantabria players
Real Ávila CF players
UD Tamaraceite footballers
CD Mensajero players
I-League players
RoundGlass Punjab FC players
Spanish expatriate footballers
Spanish expatriate sportspeople in India
Expatriate footballers in India